Gnorimoschema nilsi is a moth in the family Gelechiidae. It was described by Peter Huemer in 1996. It is found in the Alps of Austria and Italy.

The length of the forewings is 6.8–8 mm. The ground colour consists of white scales with greyish-brown tips. There rust-brown scales along the veins and well defined dark grey-brown costal, discocellular, plical and basal dots. The hindwings are dark grey brown with a satin luster. Adults have been recorded on wing from mid-July to mid-August.

References

Gnorimoschema
Moths described in 1996